Luis Geovanny Segovia Vega, known as Luis Segovia (born 26 October 1997) is an Ecuadorian professional footballer who plays as a centre back for Campeonato Brasileiro Série A club Botafogo.

Club career
Segovia made his debut for El Nacional in 2015 and went in to make 105 appearances at centre back before being signed by Independiente del Valle on 24 January 2019 for a net value of $600,000. It was to be a successful season for Segovia and the club.

Alongside midfielder Alan Franco, Segovia was the only ever present starter in Independiente del Valle's unexpected 2019 Copa Sudamericana triumph. Segovia commented that whilst in lockdown during the COVID-19 pandemic he would rewatch the final on YouTube for motivation.

In February 2020, Segovia played in the Recopa Sudamericana, the annual continental Super Cup that pits the previous year's champions of the Copa Libertadores and the Copa Sudamericana, South America's premier club competitions, against each other. On this occasion Flamengo of Brazil triumphed on 26 February 2020 at the Maracanã in Rio de Janeiro, 5–2 on aggregate, to claim their first Recopa Sudamericana title. One Segovia back header inadvertently leading to a goal from striker Gabriel Barbosa.

International career
Segovia represented Ecuador at the 2017 South American U-20 Championship and the 2017 FIFA U-20 World Cup.

He was part of the Ecuador U-23 squad that participated in the 2020 CONMEBOL Pre-Olympic Tournament, where it lost all the games and failed to qualify for the Tokyo Olympics.

He made his debut for the Ecuador national team on 27 October 2021 in a friendly against Mexico.

References

1997 births
Living people
Footballers from Quito
Ecuadorian footballers
Association football defenders
Ecuador under-20 international footballers
Ecuador international footballers
Ecuadorian Serie A players
C.D. El Nacional footballers
C.S.D. Independiente del Valle footballers
Botafogo de Futebol e Regatas players
Ecuadorian expatriate sportspeople in Brazil
Expatriate footballers in Brazil